Asia Institute is defunct organization active between 1966 and 1979 in Shiraz, Iran.

Asia Institute may also refer to:

Organizations
Asia Institute (UCLA), research center at the University of California, Los Angeles 
Asia Institute (Melbourne), Asian languages and culture institute at the University of Melbourne
Asia Institute (UVA), multidisciplinary center at the University of Virginia 
The Asia Institute, public policy think tank founded in 2007, active in Seoul, Republic of Korea